Oleksandr Chizhevskiy Club (Ukrainian:Клуб Олександра Чижевського) is a non-official name of list of the football players who during their career in the Ukrainian Premier League  had more than 300 official match appearances. This club was named in honor of Oleksandr Chizhevskiy, who first achieved this goal.

The all-time appearance leader with 426 matches is Oleksandr Shovkovskyi, who also holds a record for the most appearances playing for the single club – Dynamo Kyiv. Among the players active in the league now, Andriy Pyatov is the highest-ranked player with 330 league games. Overall, 31 players managed to play in at least 300 matches in the competition.

Oleksandr Chizhevskiy Club 
 Bold shows players still playing in the Ukrainian Premier League.
 Italics show players still playing professional football in other leagues

References 
 Carpe diem. Vitaliy Reva - sixteenth three-hundreder (Carpe diem. Виталий Рева - шестнадцатый трёхсотник). UA-Football. 18 July 2010

Ukrainian football trophies and awards
Lists of association football players
Ukrainian Premier League